Reuben G. Doud (January 20, 1830 – October 2, 1878) was an American businessman and politician.  He was the 20th and 22nd Mayor of Racine, Wisconsin.

Biography

Born in McGraw, New York, in Cortland County, to Reuben and Betsey McGraw Doud.  In 1849, Doud moved to Wisconsin, first arriving in Racine, then traveling to Delavan, and finally settling near Green Bay.  He entered the transportation business as a cabin boy on Fox River steamboats.

In 1856, he traveled to Pittsburgh, Pennsylvania, and purchased a steamboat, which he navigated down the Ohio River, up the Mississippi, to the Wisconsin River, and was the first boat to pass through the completed locks on the Fox River after the improvements had been completed that year.  He made the same trip again in 1857, after building another steamboat in Pittsburgh, the Appleton Belle, which he then sold in Oshkosh.  He then began building steamboats in Wisconsin, building and operating the Fountain City and Bay City, which traveled a route between Berlin, Oshkosh, Fond du Lac and Green Bay.

In 1861, he sold his interests on this existing transportation route and relocated to Gills Landing, Wisconsin, and became involved in the warehousing business there, and constructed a tannery.  He continued to operate the steamboat Berlin City, on a route between Green Bay and New London, and, in 1863 and 1864, manufactured two new boats, the Northwestern and Tigress.

In 1866, he moved to Racine, Wisconsin, and began a partnership with Martin E. Tremble to enter the lumber industry.  Tremble and Doud owned significant forested lands and operated a mill on the Big Suamico River, near Green Bay.  He built two schooners, the Reuben Doud and M. E. Tremble, and purchased a third, Rainbow.

In 1877, while preparing a European trip with his family, Doud was hospitalized.  He died at the Northern Hospital for the Insane in Winnebago, Wisconsin, September 30, 1877.

Public office

In 1864, while living in Gills Landing, Doud was elected as a Republican to represent Waupaca County in the Wisconsin State Assembly for the 1865 session.

After moving to Racine, he was elected Mayor of the city in 1872, 1873, and 1875.

Personal and family life

On September 15, 1864, Doud married Katharine Reynolds of Cortland, New York.  They had one daughter, Mary Elizabeth.

Notes

1830 births
1877 deaths
People from Cortland County, New York
People from Waupaca County, Wisconsin
Businesspeople from Racine, Wisconsin
Mayors of Racine, Wisconsin
Republican Party members of the Wisconsin State Assembly
19th-century American politicians
19th-century American businesspeople